Haddon Township may refer to the following townships in the United States:

 Haddon Township, Sullivan County, Indiana
 Haddon Township, New Jersey